Cerdistus is a genus of robber flies in the subfamily Asilinae.

Species 

 Cerdistus acuminatus (Theodor, 1980)
 Cerdistus antilco (Walker, 1849)
 Cerdistus australasiae (Schiner, 1868)
 Cerdistus australis (Macquart, 1847)
 Cerdistus australis (Lehr, 1967)
 Cerdistus begauxi (Tomasovic, 2005)
 Cerdistus blascozumetai (Weinberg & Bächli, 1975)
 Cerdistus claripes (White, 1918)
 Cerdistus coedicus (Walker, 1849)
 Cerdistus creticus (Hüttinger & Hradský, 1983)
 Cerdistus cygnis (Dakin & Fordham, 1922)
 Cerdistus dactylopygus (Janssens, 1968)
 Cerdistus debilis (Becker, 1923)
 Cerdistus desertorum (Efflatoun, 1934)
 Cerdistus elegans (Bigot, 1888)
 Cerdistus elicitus (Walker, 1851)
 Cerdistus erythruroides (Theodor, 1980)
 Cerdistus exilis (Macquart, 1838)
 Cerdistus flavicinctus (White, 1914)
 Cerdistus graminis (White, 1914)
 Cerdistus hermonensis (Theodor, 1980)
 Cerdistus indifferens (Becker, 1923)
 Cerdistus jubatus (Becker, 1923)
 Cerdistus laetus (Becker, 1925)
 Cerdistus lativentris (Pandellé, 1905)
 Cerdistus lautus (White, 1918)
 Cerdistus lekesi (Moucha & Hradský, 1963)
 Cerdistus lividus (White, 1918)
 Cerdistus manii (Schiner, 1867)
 Cerdistus maricus (Walker, 1851)
 Cerdistus melanomerus (Tsacas, 1964)
 Cerdistus mellis (Macquart, 1838)
 Cerdistus novus (Lehr, 1995)
 Cerdistus olympianus (Janssens, 1959)
 Cerdistus pallidus (Efflatoun, 1927)
 Cerdistus prostratus (Hardy, 1935)
 Cerdistus rectangularis (Theodor, 1980)
 Cerdistus rufometatarsus (Macquart, 1855)
 Cerdistus rusticanoides (Hardy, 1926)
 Cerdistus rusticanus (White, 1918)
 Cerdistus santoriensis (Hüttinger & Hradský, 1983)
 Cerdistus separatus (Hardy, 1935)
 Cerdistus setifemoratus (Macquart, 1855)
 Cerdistus setosus (Hardy, 1920)
 Cerdistus sugonjaevi (Lehr, 1967)
 Cerdistus villicatus (Walker, 1851)

References 

 Lehr, P.A., 1995: Revision of robber flies of the genera Cerdistus and Filiolus with descriptions of three new genera from Palaearctic (Diptera, Asilidae, Asilinae). Zoologicheskii Zhurnal, 74(1), pages 57–75

External links 
 
 

Asilinae
Asilidae genera